State Route 51 (SR 51) is a  state highway in the southeastern and east-central parts of the U.S. state of Alabama. The southern terminus of the highway is at an intersection with U.S. Route 84 (US 84) near New Brockton. The northern terminus of the highway is at an interchange with I-85/US 29/US 280 at Opelika.

Route description
While it is signed as a north–south route, the orientation of SR 51 is rather irregular. From its southern terminus near New Brockton, the highway heads in a northeasterly direction, traveling through rural areas and small towns in the southeastern part of the state.

SR 51 travels through Clio, the birthplace of former Alabama governor George C. Wallace and Baseball Hall of Fame member Don Sutton. At Clio, the highway turns briefly turns northward, then resumes its northward trajectory as it heads towards Clayton. At Clayton, the highway then turns northwestward then northward as it heads towards Midway.

At Midway, SR 51 joins US 82 and turns westward. The concurrency of the two highways ends east of Union Springs. SR 51 then resumes a northeastward trajectory until it approaches Hurtsboro. The highway then turns northward, continuing this orientation until it reaches its northern terminus at Opelika.

History

When SR 51 was formed in 1940, it covered only the route between Clayton and Midway. The highway was extended to its current southern terminus in 1957, and was extended to its current northern terminus in 1986.

Major intersections

See also

References

External links

051
Transportation in Coffee County, Alabama
Transportation in Dale County, Alabama
Transportation in Barbour County, Alabama
Transportation in Bullock County, Alabama
Transportation in Macon County, Alabama
Transportation in Russell County, Alabama
Transportation in Lee County, Alabama